Stenoterommata iguazu is a species of mygalomorph spiders of Argentina, named after its type locality: Iguazú, Misiones. Females are distinguished  from other species in the genus, except S. platense, by the 2 + 2 spermathecae; from S. platense, they are distinguished by the outer spermathecal lobe having a single receptaculum. Males are distinguished from other species, except S. platense, by having a thin, well-sclerotized embolus and the bulbal duct with an even curvature; from S. platense, by the sudden tapering apical portion of the bulbal duct and the slightly smaller size.

Description
Male: total length ; cephalothorax length , width ; cephalic region length , width . Labium length , width . Sternum length , width . Its labium has no cuspules. Its sternal sigilla are small, oval and shallow; its sternum with a clear reborder. Chelicerae: rastellum with only long, thin and attenuate setae. Cheliceral tumescence is present, covered with hairs.
Female: total length ; cephalothorax length , width ; cephalic region length , width ; fovea width ; labium length , width ; sternum length , width . Its cephalic region is convex with the fovea slightly procurved. The labia have 3 cuspules. Its sternal sigilla are small, oval, shallow and marginal; sternum is rebordered. Chelicerae: rastellum formed by thick setae; colour similar to S. Platense.

Distribution
Northern Misiones Province, Argentina.

See also
Spider anatomy
Iguazú National Park

References

External links
 ITIS entry
 ADW entry
EOL entry
BioLib entry

Pycnothelidae
Spiders of Argentina
Spiders described in 1995